John E. Scott (born July 24, 1939, in Charleston, Missouri) has been a Democrat state senator from Missouri where he served as senate president pro tem from 1983 until 1988.

References

External links
 Blunt, Matt "Official Manual State of Missouri, 2001-2002"

Democratic Party Missouri state senators
People from Charleston, Missouri
1939 births
Living people
20th-century American politicians